The Russian Ministry of Foreign Affairs operates a network of overseas schools for children of Russian diplomats.

Algeria
 Russian Embassy School in Algiers
Angola
 Russian Embassy School in Luanda
Argentina
 Russian Embassy School in Buenos Aires
Australia
 Russian Embassy School in Canberra - Located on the grounds of the Embassy of Russia in Canberra in Griffith, Australian Capital Territory - Established in 2001, it is a primary school only and it also admits international students on a tuition basis
Austria
 Russian Embassy School in Vienna
Bangladesh
 Russian Embassy School in Dhaka
Belgium
 Russian Embassy School in Brussels
Brazil
 Russian Embassy School in Brasília
Bulgaria
 Russian Embassy School in Sofia
Cambodia
 Russian Embassy School in Phnom Penh
Chile
 Russian Embassy School in Santiago
China
 Russian Embassy School in Beijing
 Russian Consulate School in Shanghai - Primary school only, located on the grounds of the Consulate-General of Russia in Shanghai in Hongkou District
Colombia
 Russian Embassy School in Bogota
Cuba
 Russian Embassy School in Havana
Cyprus
 Russian Embassy School in Nicosia
Czech Republic
 Russian Embassy School in Prague
Denmark
 Russian Embassy School in Copenhagen
Egypt
 Russian Embassy School in Cairo
Ethiopia
 Russian Embassy School in Addis Ababa
Finland
 Russian Embassy School in Helsinki
France
 Russian Embassy School in Paris
 Russian Mission School in Strasbourg
Germany
 Russian Embassy School in Berlin
 Russian Consulate School in Bonn
Greece
 Russian Embassy School in Athens
Guinea
 Russian Embassy School in Conakry
Hungary
 Russian Embassy School in Budapest
India
 Russian Embassy School in Delhi
 Russian Consulate School in Chennai - Primary school, established in 1972
 Russian Consulate School in Mumbai - Primary school
Indonesia
 Russian Embassy School in Jakarta
Iran
 Russian Embassy School in Tehran
Israel
 Russian Embassy School in Tel Aviv
Italy
 Russian Embassy School in Rome
Japan
 Russian Embassy School in Tokyo
Jordan
 Russian Embassy School in Amman
North Korea
 Russian Embassy School in Pyongyang
South Korea
 Russian Embassy School in Seoul
Kuwait
 Russian Embassy School in Kuwait
Laos
 Russian Embassy School in Vientiane
Libya
 Russian Embassy School in Tripoli
Madagascar
 Russian Embassy School in Antananarivo
Malaysia
 Russian Embassy School in Kuala Lumpur
Mali
 Russian Embassy School in Bamako
Malta
 Russian Embassy School in Valletta
Mexico
 Russian Embassy School in Mexico City
Mongolia
 Russian Embassy School in Ulaanbaatar
Morocco
 Russian Embassy School in Rabat
Myanmar
 Russian Embassy School in Yangon
Nepal
 Russian Embassy School in Kathmandu
Nicaragua
 Russian Embassy School in Managua
Nigeria
 Russian Consulate School in Lagos
Norway
 Russian Embassy School in Oslo
Pakistan
 Russian Embassy School in Islamabad
 Russian Consulate School in Karachi
Peru
 Russian Embassy School in Lima
Poland
 Russian Embassy School in Warsaw
Portugal
 Russian Embassy School in Lisbon
Romania
 Russian Embassy School in Bucharest
Serbia
 Russian Embassy School in Belgrade
Slovakia
 Russian Embassy School in Bratislava
Slovenia
 Russian Embassy School in Ljubljana
South Africa
 Russian Embassy School in Pretoria
Spain
 Russian Embassy School in Madrid
Sri Lanka
 Russian Embassy School in Colombo
Sweden
 Russian Embassy School in Stockholm
Switzerland
 Russian Mission School in Geneva (serving families in Geneva and Bern)
Syria
 Russian Embassy School in Damascus
Tanzania
 Russian Embassy School in Dar es Salaam
Thailand
 Russian Embassy School in Bangkok
Tunisia
 Russian Embassy School in Tunis
Turkey
 Russian Embassy School in Ankara
 Russian Consulate School in Istanbul
United Kingdom
 Russian Embassy School in London
United States
 Russian Embassy School in Washington, D.C.
 Russian Mission School in New York
Vietnam
 Russian Embassy School in Hanoi
 Russian Consulate School in Ho Chi Minh City
Yemen
 Russian Embassy School in Sana'a
Zambia
 Russian Embassy School in Lusaka

References

Lists of international schools
Russia education-related lists